Radek Špiláček (born 10 January 1980) is a Czech former professional footballer who played as a midfielder.

References

External links

1980 births
Living people
Sportspeople from Opava
Czech footballers
Association football midfielders
Czech Republic youth international footballers
Czech Republic under-21 international footballers
SFC Opava players
SK Sigma Olomouc players
TSG 1899 Hoffenheim players
FSV Frankfurt players
SV Wilhelmshaven players
SSV Jeddeloh players